Stéphane Goubert (born 13 March 1970) is a French retired professional road bicycle racer. He finished in the top 20 of the Tour de France 3 times, with his highest finish being 16th in 2009, but he never managed to claim an individual win.
Goubert was sports director at the 2020 Vuelta a España. In 2007 Goubert placed the highest out of all french riders in the 2007 Tour de France and 2007 Vuelta a España.

Major results

1995
 7th Japan Cup Cycle Road Race
 8th Paris–Camembert
1996
 6th Overall Tour Méditerranéen
 10th Overall Route du Sud
2002
 4th Overall Route du Sud
 5th A Travers le Morbihan
2003
 4th Tour du Haut Var
 10th A Travers le Morbihan
2004
 1st Mountains classification Route du Sud
2005
 7th Overall Vuelta a Castilla y León
1st Stage 3 (TTT)
 7th Grand Prix d'Ouverture La Marseillaise
 9th Overall Bayern Rundfahrt
2006
 8th Overall Route du Sud
2007
 9th Overall Tour du Limousin
 10th Grand Prix de Plumelec-Morbihan
2008
 2nd GP de Fourmies
 3rd Overall Tour de l'Ain
 8th Clásica de San Sebastián
 8th Overall Four Days of Dunkirk

Grand Tour general classification results timeline

References

External links 
Profile at AG2R Prévoyance official website

1970 births
Living people
French male cyclists
Sportspeople from Montpellier
Cyclists from Occitania (administrative region)